Seo Yoon-hee (born 10 November 1984) is a badminton player from South Korea. She graduated from the SacredHeart Girl's High School, and later joined the Samsung Electro-Mechanics team.

Seo played badminton at the 2004 Summer Olympics for Korea, defeating Pi Hongyan of France in the first round but losing to Petya Nedelcheva of Bulgaria in the round of 16.

Achievements

World Junior Championships 
Girls' singles

Asian Junior Championships 
Girls' singles

BWF Grand Prix 
The BWF Grand Prix had two levels, the BWF Grand Prix and Grand Prix Gold. It was a series of badminton tournaments sanctioned by the Badminton World Federation (BWF) which was held from 2007 to 2017. The World Badminton Grand Prix has been sanctioned by the International Badminton Federation from 1983 to 2006.

Women's singles

Women's doubles

  BWF Grand Prix Gold tournament
  BWF & IBF Grand Prix tournament

References

External links 
 
 

1984 births
Living people
South Korean female badminton players
Badminton players at the 2004 Summer Olympics
Olympic badminton players of South Korea